Fabio Jesús Pereyra (born 31 January 1990) is an Argentine professional footballer who plays as a centre-back for Argentine outfit Central Córdoba (SdE).

Career
Pereyra began in the ranks of Club Ateneo, before signing with CAI of Torneo Argentino A as the defender was selected in thirteen matches during the 2011–12 campaign which ended with relegation. He remained with the club for two further seasons, the latter back in Torneo Argentino A following promotion. On 30 June 2014, Pereyra completed a move to Torneo Federal A's Tiro Federal. He scored his first goal for them in his fifth appearance, netting the leveller in a 1–1 tie with Defensores de Belgrano. Fellow third tier team Independiente signed Pereyra. Like with CAI, his first season with Independiente concluded with them being relegated.

In June 2016, Pereyra returned to Torneo Federal A after agreeing to join San Jorge. He scored one goal, against Guaraní Antonio Franco on 4 October 2017, in forty-four appearances in all competitions across the 2016–17 and 2017–18 seasons. Pereyra joined Primera B Nacional side Arsenal de Sarandí ahead of 2018–19. His professional debut arrived on 25 August 2018 during a home draw with Gimnasia y Esgrima. Then near the end of January 2021, 'Paio' terminated his contract with Arsenal de Sarandí to join Peruvian side FBC Melgar.

Personal life
Pereyra's brother, Javier, is also a footballer.

Career statistics
.

Honours
CAI
Torneo Argentino B: 2012–13

References

External links

1990 births
Living people
Sportspeople from Entre Ríos Province
Argentine footballers
Argentine expatriate footballers
Association football defenders
Torneo Argentino A players
Torneo Argentino B players
Torneo Federal A players
Primera Nacional players
Comisión de Actividades Infantiles footballers
Tiro Federal footballers
San Jorge de Tucumán footballers
Arsenal de Sarandí footballers
FBC Melgar footballers
Central Córdoba de Santiago del Estero footballers
Argentine expatriate sportspeople in Peru
Expatriate footballers in Peru